Bromazine, sold under the brand names Ambodryl, Ambrodil, and Deserol among others, also known as bromodiphenhydramine, is an antihistamine and anticholinergic medication of the ethanolamine class. It is an analogue of diphenhydramine with a bromine substitution on one of the phenyl rings.

Synthesis

Grignard reaction between phenylmagnesium bromide and para-bromobenzaldehyde [1122-91-4] (1) gives p-bromobenzhydrol [29334-16-5] (2). Halogenation with acetyl bromide in benzene solvent gives p-bromo-benzhydrylbromide [18066-89-2] (3). Finally, etherification with deanol completed the synthesis of Bromazine (4).

Side effects
Continuous and/or cumulative use of anticholinergic medications, including first-generation antihistamines, is associated with higher risk for cognitive decline and dementia in older people.

References

Bromoarenes
Ethers
Dimethylamino compounds
H1 receptor antagonists